Eunice Spry (born 28 April 1944) is a British woman from Tewkesbury in Gloucestershire, a Jehovah's Witness who was convicted of 26 charges of child abuse against children in her foster care in April 2007. She was sentenced to 14 years' imprisonment and ordered to pay £80,000 costs. In sentencing, the judge told Spry that it was the "worst case in his 40 years practising law".

The foster mother forced three children in her care (two foster, one adopted) to eat their own excrement and vomit, rammed sticks down the children's throats, rubbed their faces with sandpaper, and locked two of them naked in a room for a month. Two of her foster children and her adopted daughter have published books about their childhoods. Her oldest foster son, Christopher Spry, nicknamed 'Child C', published a book of the same name about his childhood living with Eunice Spry. Her foster daughter, Alloma Gilbert, published Deliver Me from Evil.  Victoria Spry published Tortured in April 2015.

Spry also had two other children in her care at this time, one adopted daughter and one adopted son (Christopher's younger brother), but these children did not experience the abuse that the aforementioned three did.

In September 2008, Spry's sentence was reduced by the High Court to 12 years. On 30 May 2014 the Gloucestershire Echo indicated she would be released in June 2014.

In September 2020, Victoria Spry died by suicide. Her siblings allege that residual trauma from the abuse she suffered led to her suicide.

References

English criminals
Living people
1944 births
Criminals from Gloucestershire
English prisoners and detainees
Prisoners and detainees of England and Wales
People from Tewkesbury
English people convicted of assault
British people convicted of perverting the course of justice
2007 in England
British Jehovah's Witnesses
Torture in England